This is a list of geographical features in the state of Saarland, Germany.

Rivers 

 Moselle
 Saar

Lakes 

 Bostalsee
 Losheimer Stausee

Cities 
see List of cities in Germany.

Geography of Saarland
Saarland
Saarland-related lists